The Berlin-based music project The/Das was formed by the former Bodi Bill members Anton K. Feist and Fabian Fenk  in 2012.

History
The/Das describe their music basically as Techno Tenderness. On stage The/Das usually performs with the support of the Apparat drummer Jörg Wähner and the DJ Thomalla.

Their first EP Fresh Water had been published in 2012 in collaboration with Tale Of Us via the Italian label Life and Death. They continued producing the EP Outfashioned in 2013.

By changing the label, the duo's mini debut album Speak You Mind - including 5 songs- was released via the independent label Sinnbus in 2013.

The recent LP Freezer was released in 2014. The video to the single My Made Up Spook was made while a trip to India.

That album received very positive reactions. The Line of Best Fit described the album as "wonderfully experimental, toying with our perceptions of space, texture and structure" and their music as "the missing link between avante-garde ambient techno and noir-pop"  meanwhile Lound And Quite says their music is "art pop with a soulful tint" 

Next to their music project, Anton is working as a sound engineer and Fabian is currently doing DJ-Sets.

In April 2015, The/Das did a Boiler Room Session in Mexico.

Band name
“We were looking for a name that could work like a blanc screen. One could say we were looking for a name with as little meaning as possible, so that with every track we produce the initial meaning would become more meaningful something indefinite to start with: no meaning yet, but some meaning in the future maybe“, stated band member Fabian in an interview.

Albums
2013 – Speak Your Mind (CD, Album; Sinnbus)
2014 – Freezer (LP, CD, Album; Sinnbus)
2017 - Exit Strategies (LP, Album;)

Singles and EPs
2012 – Tale Of Us & The/Das – Fresh Water EP (EP, Vinyl, Mp3; Life and Death)
2013 – "Outfashioned" (Vinyl, MP3; Life and Death)
2013 – "Have No Fear" (MP3, Single; Sinnbus)
2013 – "It's True" (MP3, Single; Sinnbus)
2014 – "My Made-Up Spook" (MP3, Single; Sinnbus)

References

German electronic music groups